Sébastien Philippe (born 8 February 1975) is a French racing driver. He has competed in such series as Super GT and the French Formula Three Championship. Philippe won the All-Japan Formula Three Championship in 2000 and previously had won the 1993 Formula Campus by Renault and Elf season. He also finished runner-up in Super GT's GT500 category in 2006 alongside Shinya Hosokawa.

Philippe currently manages the French motorsport team ART Grand Prix.

References

External links
 Career statistics from Driver Database

1975 births
Living people
French racing drivers
French Formula Three Championship drivers
Japanese Formula 3 Championship drivers
Super GT drivers
Karting World Championship drivers
Place of birth missing (living people)
People from Villeurbanne
Sportspeople from Lyon Metropolis
Formule Campus Renault Elf drivers
Team Kunimitsu drivers
Mugen Motorsports drivers
La Filière drivers
OAK Racing drivers
ART Grand Prix drivers